Cosmopolitan Church of Prayer is a Chicago church founded by gospel singer and pastor Charles G. Hayes.

References

External links
Website

Churches in Chicago